Bernard VII may refer to:

 Bernard VII, Count of Armagnac (1360–1418)
 Bernard VII, Lord of Lippe (1428–1511)